Beachwood City Schools is a public school district that serves Beachwood, Ohio. The district has about 1,500 students from pre-kindergarten to 12th grade and comprises Fairmount Early Childhood Center, Bryden Elementary, Hilltop Elementary, Beachwood Middle School, and Beachwood High School.

Notable alumni
 Marc Cohn - singer
 Terren Peizer - investor and business executive
 Jonathan Goldstein - screenwriter, television writer and producer, and film director
 Josh Mandel - politician

References

External links

Beachwood, Ohio
School districts in Cuyahoga County, Ohio